The Pop Secret Microwave Popcorn 400 was a NASCAR Winston Cup Series event that took place in November at the North Carolina Motor Speedway from 1965 to 2003. It was the first NASCAR Cup Series victory for three drivers including Mark Martin in 1989, Ward Burton in 1995, and Johnny Benson in 2002. It was the final race win for Bill Elliott in 2003.

This race, typically run as the penultimate race of the NASCAR season, was dropped from the schedule after the 2003 season. The Pop Secret sponsorship was moved over to the newly acquired Labor Day date at Auto Club Speedway, while the late season date was originally taken over by the Southern 500 at Darlington and is now occupied by the AAA Texas 500 at Texas.

Past winners

Multiple winners (drivers)

Multiple winners (manufacturers)

Notable races
1965: Curtis Turner posted his final Grand National win, driving the Wood Brothers Racing #41 following his reinstatement to NASCAR.
1967: Bobby Allison posted his first Rockingham win. Formula One legend Jim Clark made his only NASCAR start in this race.
1968: Richard Petty outlasted Cale Yarborough and Bobby Isaac for his only win of the season on a track bigger than a short track.
1972: Bobby Allison battled Richard Petty, David Pearson, and Buddy Baker, ultimately leading 217 laps for his tenth win of 1972 and final win with the Richard Howard team led by Junior Johnson.
1973: Pearson posted his eleventh win of the 1973 season while Benny Parsons won the season championship despite severe damage in an early crash.
1976: Richard Petty defeated Lennie Pond for the win, despite several green-flag pitstops — Petty won despite 125 total seconds in the pits to Pond's 54 seconds.
1977: Donnie Allison outclassed the field for his second win of the season.
1979: Darrell Waltrip, entering the race with the Winston Cup point lead, finished a distant sixth as Petty grabbed the win and the point lead.
1980: Multiple crashes thinned the field as Cale Yarborough took the win in a close points race with sophomore Dale Earnhardt.  The race lead changed 35 times.
1981: Darrell Waltrip and Bobby Allison, locked in a bitter point battle, finished 1–2; the lead changed 33 times in total and five times over the final 32 laps between Waltrip and Allison.
1982: Allison spun out of the pits on his final pitstop and Waltrip seized the win.
1983: Terry Labonte broke out of a duel with Tim Richmond for the win, his first in three years.
1984: Bill Elliott edged Harry Gant in a photo finish after Gant seized the lead with two to go.
1992: In the final race Richard Petty would compete in at the Petty's native North Carolina; son Kyle, in the hunt for the 1992 championship, dominated the race, leading all but 8 laps en route to the younger Petty collecting his 2nd victory of the season; which was the only time Kyle Petty won more than one race in a season.
1994: In addition to winning the race, Dale Earnhardt clinched his 7th title at the Rock.
1995: Ward Burton won his first race at the Rock after a late season change to Bill Davis Racing.
2001: Joe Nemechek gave Andy Petree Racing their last win in NASCAR by leading the most laps.
2002: Johnny Benson finally clinched the win at the Rock for his first win over a hard-charging Mark Martin. 
2003: Bill Elliott's victory in this race was the last win of his career.

External links
 

Former NASCAR races
 
1965 establishments in North Carolina
2003 disestablishments in North Carolina
Recurring sporting events established in 1965
Recurring sporting events disestablished in 2003
Defunct sports competitions in the United States